An invention disclosure, or invention disclosure report, is a confidential document written by a scientist or engineer for use by a company's patent department, or by an external patent attorney, to determine whether patent protection should be sought for the described invention. It may follow a standardized form established within a company.

See also 
 Inventor's notebook
 Lab notebook
 Electronic lab notebook
 Laboratory information management system
 LEDES invention disclosure data format
 Scientific management

References

Scientific documents
Research